This is a list of buildings that are examples of the Brutalist architectural style in the United States.

Alabama
 University Chapel, Tuskegee University, Tuskegee

Alaska
 Z.J. Loussac Public Library, Anchorage (1986)

Arizona
 Phoenix Symphony Hall, Phoenix

Arkansas
 Bank of America Plaza, Little Rock

California
 All original Bay Area Rapid Transit (BART) stations, San Francisco Bay Area (1972–73)
Berkeley Art Museum and Pacific Film Archive (former campus on Bancroft Way), UC Berkeley, (Mario Ciampi, 1970)
 Briggs Hall, University of California, Davis (unknown, 1971)
 Cal Poly Pomona College of Environmental Design
 Campus of the University of California, Irvine
 Claire Trevor School of the Arts
 Crawford Hall (Irvine)
 Cathedral of St. Mary of the Assumption, San Francisco
 Cathedral of Our Lady of the Angels, Los Angeles
 Crafton Hills Community College, Yucaipa
 Earl Warren College
 Embarcadero Substation, San Francisco
 Evans Hall (UC Berkeley)
 Geisel Library, University of California, San Diego, San Diego (William Pereira, 1970)
 Hilton San Francisco Financial District
 Huntington Beach Public Library
 Hyatt Regency San Francisco Airport
 Inglewood City Hall, Inglewood, California
 Irvine High School
 Oakland Museum of California, Oakland (Kevin Roche, 1969)
 Portsmouth Square pedestrian bridge
 Salk Institute for Biological Studies, La Jolla

 Sam Bell Pavilion, La Jolla
 Samitaur, Los Angeles
 San Diego Stadium, San Diego, (Frank L. Hope & Associates, 1967) (demolished)
 Sears, Roebuck and Company Pacific Coast Territory Administrative Offices, Alhambra
 Sheats Goldstein House, Los Angeles
 St. Basil's Catholic Church, Los Angeles
 UC Berkeley College of Environmental Design, Wurster Hall Berkeley, Vernon DeMars, (1964)
 Vaillancourt Fountain, Justin Herman Plaza, San Francisco (Armand Vaillancourt, 1971)
 Yosemite Hall, Cal Poly, San Luis Obispo, San Luis Obispo (Falk & Booth, 1969)

Colorado
 Arapahoe Community College, Littleton (1974)
 Federal Reserve Bank of Kansas City Denver Branch, Denver
 Mesa Laboratory, Boulder (1966)
 Engineering Center, University of Colorado at Boulder, Boulder (1965)

Connecticut

 Becton Engineering and Applied Science Center, Yale University, New Haven
 Beinecke Rare Book & Manuscript Library, New Haven
 Community Services Building, New Haven
 Crawford Manor
 Dixwell Avenue Congregational United Church of Christ
 Ezra Stiles and Samuel Morse Colleges, Yale University, New Haven
 Homer D. Babbidge Library
 Hotel Marcel (former Pirelli Tire Building), New Haven (Marcel Breuer & Robert F. Gatje, 1969)
 Kline Biology Tower
 Knights of Columbus Building, New Haven
 Louis Micheels House
 New Haven Central Fire Station, New Haven
 New Haven Coliseum, New Haven (Kevin Roche / John Dinkeloo & Associates, 1972) (demolished 2006–2007)
 Rudolph Hall, New Haven (Paul Rudolph, 1963)
 Temple Street Parking Garage, New Haven

Delaware
 I. M. Pei Building, Wilmington

Florida
 1111 Lincoln Road, Miami
 Disney's Contemporary Resort, Walt Disney World (Welton Becket, 1971)
 Mailman Center for Child Development, Miami
 Metrorail stations, early 1980s heavy metro system (1984)
 Miami-Dade County School Board Administration Building South Tower, Miami
 Office in the Grove, Coconut Grove, Miami (Kenneth Treister, 1972)
 Orlando Public Library, Orlando (John M. Johansen, 1966)
 The University of Florida Levin College of Law

Georgia
 AmericasMart Building 3, Atlanta
 Atlanta Central Library, Atlanta
 Atlanta Marriott Marquis, Atlanta
 CNN Center, Atlanta
 Colony Square, Atlanta
 Park Place on Peachtree condominiums, Atlanta (Ted Levy, 1984–1987)

DeKalb County
Structures include:
 Southern Bell Telephone & Telegraph Co., 2204 LaVista Road NE (ca. 1970)
 Robert T. "Bobby" Burgess Building, DeKalb County Police Department, 3610 Camp Drive (1972)
 First National Bank of Atlanta, 2849 N. Druid Hills Road NE (ca. 1973)
 Clairemont Oaks, 441 Clairemont Avenue (1973-1975)
 DeKalb County Parking Deck, 125 W. Trinity Place (1974)
 Brevard Professional Building, 246 Sycamore Street (1974)
 Woodruff Health Sciences Center Administrative Building (WHSCAB) at Emory University, 1440 Clifton Road (1976)
 Emory Rehabilitation Hospital, 1441 Clifton Road (1976)
 Coan Recreation Center, 1530 Woodbine Avenue SE (1976)
 Bank of America, 155 Clairemont Avenue (ca. 1982)
 Kensington Marta Station, 3350 Kensington Road (1993)

Hawaii
 Hawaii State Capitol
 Jefferson Hall, East–West Center

Idaho
 Intermountain Gas Building, Boise
 Whiting House, Sun Valley

Illinois
 Arthur J. Schmitt Academic Center, DePaul University. Chicago (C.F. Murphy and Associates, 1968)
 Blue Cross-Blue Shield Building
 Cummings Life Sciences Center, Chicago
 Faner Hall (SIUC), Southern Illinois University Carbondale, Carbondale (1974)
 Henry Hinds Laboratory, Chicago
 Joseph Regenstein Library, University of Chicago (Walter Netsch, 1970)
 Kirsch Residence, Oak Park
 Lincoln Executive Plaza, Chicago
 Marina City, Chicago
 Metropolitan Correctional Center, Chicago
 Norris University Center
 Northwestern University Library, Evanston, (Walter Netsch, 1966–70)
 Old Prentice Women's Hospital Building
 Raymond Hilliard Homes, Chicago* Thomas Rees Memorial Carillon, Washington Park, [[Springfield, Illinois]|Springfield]], Bill Turley, (1962)
 University Hall (University of Illinois Chicago)
 Will County Courthouse, Joliet (1969)

Indiana
 Bracken Library
 Clowes Memorial Hall, Butler University, Indianapolis, Evans Woollen III and John M. Johansen, (1963)
 College Life Insurance Company of America Headquarters, Indianapolis
 Eskenazi Museum of Art, Bloomington (I. M. Pei, 1982)
 Herman B. Wells Library, Indiana University, Bloomington (Eggers & Higgins, 1966–69)
 Indiana University Musical Arts Center, Indiana University, Bloomington (Woollen, Molzan and Partners, 1972)
 Minton–Capehart Federal Building, Indianapolis (Evans Woollen III, Woollen, Molzan and Partners, 1976)
 Southside Junior High School, Columbus

Iowa
 Carver Hall
 Civic Center of Greater Des Moines
 Iowa State Center

Kansas
 Wichita Central Library, Wichita (Schaefer Schirmer & Eflin Architects, 1965-1967)

Kentucky
Kentucky International Convention Center
Patterson Office Tower

Louisiana
Structures include
Baton Rouge River Center
Hale Boggs Memorial Bridge
Lafayette Parish courthouse
Louisiana National Bank Building.
Tangipahoa Parish courthouse

Maine
Franklin Towers
University of Maine School of Law Building

Maryland
 Baltimore County Circuit Courthouses, Towson
 Morris A. Mechanic Theatre, Baltimore (John M. Johansen, 1967) (demolished 2014)

Massachusetts

 177 Huntington
 320 Newbury Street (Boston Architectural College), Boston (Ashley, Myer & Associates, 1966)
 Alewife station, Cambridge (Ellenzweig, 1985)
 Boston City Hall, Boston (Kallmann McKinnell & Knowles/Campbell, Aldrich & Nulty, 1969)
 Boston Government Service Center, Boston (Paul Rudolph, 1962–71)
 Campus of the Massachusetts Institute of Technology
 Carpenter Center for the Visual Arts, Harvard University, Cambridge (Le Corbusier, (1962)
 Fall River Government Center, Fall River (1976)
 Fine Arts Center, University of Massachusetts, Amherst (Kevin Roche, 1975)
 The First Church of Christ, Scientist
 George Gund Hall, Harvard Graduate School of Design, Cambridge (John Andrews, 1972)
 George Sherman Union
 Harbor Towers
 Larsen Hall, Harvard University, Cambridge
 Law and Education Tower, Boston University, Boston

 Lawrence Public Library, Lawrence (Henneberg & Henneberg Architects, 1973)
 Lincoln House, Lincoln
 Mather House, Cambridge (Shepley, Bulfinch, Richardson and Abbot, 1971)
 Murray D. Lincoln Campus Center
 One Western Avenue, Harvard Business School, Boston
 Peabody Terrace
 Robert H. Goddard Library, Clark University, Worcester (John M. Johansen, 1969)
 Simmons Hall, Cambridge
 Smith Campus Center
 Solomon Carter Fuller Mental Health Center, Boston (1974)
 Technology Square
 Tisch Library
 University of Massachusetts Boston, Boston
 University of Massachusetts Dartmouth, Dartmouth (Paul Rudolph)
 Wollaston station, Quincy (1971)

Michigan
 Blue Cross/Blue Shield Service Center, Detroit, Michigan (Ginno Rossetti, 1971)
 Grand Traverse Performing Arts Center at Interlochen Center for the Arts, Interlochen, Michigan (1975)
 St. Francis de Sales Church, Norton Shores

Minnesota
 Arvonne Fraser Library
 Malcolm Moos Health Sciences Tower, University of Minnesota, Minneapolis (c. 1970)
 Peavey Plaza
 Phillips-Wangensteen Building, University of Minnesota Hospital, Minneapolis (1976)
 Rarig Center
 Riverside Plaza, Minneapolis (Ralph Rapson, 1973)
 Saint John's Abbey, Collegeville (1958-1961)

Mississippi
 Lamar Law Center, University of Mississippi
 St. Richard's Catholic Church, Jackson
 Tougaloo College, Jackson
A.A. Branch Hall
L. Zenobia Coleman Library
Renner Hall

Missouri
 Nestlé Purina PetCare Headquarters

Montana

Nebraska
 Robert V. Denney Federal Building
 Wells Fargo Center, Lincoln, NE (I.M. Pei, 1975)

Nevada
 William D. Carlson Education Building, University of Nevada, Las Vegas, Las Vegas

New Hampshire
 Christensen Hall, University of New Hampshire, Durham (Ulrich Franzen, 1970)
 Phillips Exeter Academy Library, Exeter

New Jersey
 550 Broad Street
 Galaxy Towers
 Journal Square Transportation Center, Jersey City, New Jersey (1973–1975)

New Mexico
 Farris Engineering Center, University of New Mexico, Albuquerque
 Humanities Building, University of New Mexico, Albuquerque
 Main Library, Albuquerque (George Pearl, 1978) – listed on the National Register of Historic Places in 2019.
 Spaceport America, Truth or Consequences

New York
 Bradfield Hall
 Buffalo City Court Building, Buffalo (1974)
 Cube House, Ithaca
 Empire State Plaza, Albany
 Cultural Education Center (1976-1978)
The Egg
 Endo Pharmaceuticals Building
 Engineering Building, Binghamton University, Vestal (1976)
 Erie Basin Observation Tower, Buffalo
 Everson Museum of Art, Syracuse
 First Unitarian Church, Rochester
 Folsom Library, Rensselaer Polytechnic Institute, Troy (Pierik Quinlivan & Krause, 1976)
 Herbert F. Johnson Museum of Art Cornell University, Ithaca (I.M. Pei, 1973)
 Hudson River Museum
 J. W. Chorley Elementary School
 Orange County Government Center, Goshen (Paul Rudolph, 1967)
 Palisades Center, West Nyack (1998)

New York City
 1 Police Plaza (Gruzen and Partners, 1973)
 811 Tenth Avenue
 945 Madison Avenue museum building (Marcel Breuer, 1966)
 33 Thomas Street (AT&T Long Lines Building) (John Carl Warnecke, 1974)
 Adam Clayton Powell Jr. State Office Building (Ifill, Johnson & Hanchard, 1974)
 Bobst Library, New York University (Philip Johnson, Richard Foster)
 Boston Road Apartments, Bronx
 Carman Hall, Lehman College, Bronx (1970)
 Chatham Towers, Manhattan
 Edward Durell Stone Townhouse, Manhattan
 Elmer Holmes Bobst Library
 Five Manhattan West
 Joseph Curran Building, Manhattan
 Kips Bay Towers
 Lincoln Square Synagogue, Manhattan
 Morrisania Air Rights
 New Museum, Manhattan
 New York Presbyterian Church, Queens
 New York Marriott Marquis
 North Central Bronx Hospital
 River Park Towers
 St. Frances de Chantal's Church
 St. John the Baptist Church
 St. Jude Church
 Temple Israel of the City of New York
 Tracey Towers
 Trinity Chapel, New York University
 University Village
 Waterside Plaza
 Weiss Research Building, Manhattan

North Carolina
 Bath Building, Raleigh
 Elion-Hitchings Building (Burroughs Wellcome headquarters), Durham (1971, demolished)
 Hiram H. Ward Federal Courthouse, Winston-Salem

North Dakota
 Our Lady of the Annunciation Chapel at Annunciation Priory, Bismark, North Dakota

Ohio
 Bricker Federal Building, Columbus
 Cleveland Museum of Art Education Wing, Cleveland
 Continental Center, Columbus
 Crosley Tower, Cincinnati
 Hamilton County Justice Center, Cincinnati
 Huntington Plaza, Columbus
 Hyatt Regency Columbus, Columbus
 John F. Seiberling Federal Building and United States Courthouse, Akron
 Justice Center Complex, Cleveland
 Maag Library, Youngstown State University, Youngstown (1976)
 The Ohio History Center, Columbus, (W. Byron Ireland & Associates, 1966)
 Rhodes State Office Tower, Columbus
 Rhodes Tower, Cleveland
 Seeley G. Mudd Learning Center, Oberlin College Library, Oberlin (Warner, Burns, Toan & Lunde, 1974)
 Sheraton Columbus Hotel at Capitol Square, Columbus
 The 9 Cleveland, Cleveland

Oklahoma
 Mummers Theater, Oklahoma City (demolished)

Oregon
 Salem Public Library

Pennsylvania
 1700 Market
 Benedum Hall
 Carnegie Library of Pittsburgh – Knoxville Branch, Pittsburgh (Paul Schweikher, 1965)
 Century III Mall, West Mifflin (1979)
 Charles Patterson Van Pelt Library, University of Pennsylvania, Philadelphia
 Jennie King Mellon Library, Chatham University, Pittsburgh
 Penn Mutual Tower, Philadelphia
 University of Pittsburgh, Pittsburgh
 Barco Law Building (1976)
 David Lawrence Hall (1968)
 Hillman Library (1968)
 Litchfield Towers (Deeter & Ritchey, 1963)
 School of Information Sciences Building (Tasso Katselas, 1965)
 Wesley W. Posvar Hall (1975–1978)
 Wean Hall, Carnegie Mellon University, Pittsburgh (1971)

Puerto Rico 
 Bayamón City Hall, Bayamón, Puerto Rico (1980)

Rhode Island
 Classical High School, Providence (1970)
 Community College of Rhode Island Knight Campus, Warwick (1972)
 John D. Rockefeller Jr. Library, Providence (Warner, Burns, Toan & Lunde, 1962–1964)
 John E. Fogarty Memorial Building, Providence
 Sciences Library (Brown University), Providence (1971)

South Carolina
Strom Thurmond Federal Building and United States Courthouse, Columbia

South Dakota
 McKennan Hospital additions, Sioux Falls
 Northwestern Auto Bank, Sioux Falls
 Stanley J. Marshall HPER Center, South Dakota State University

Tennessee
 Chattanooga Public Library
 Hunter Museum of American Art
 Lawson McGhee Library
 Sheraton Nashville Downtown
 University of Tennessee Art and Architecture Building

Texas
 Alkek Library, Texas State University, San Marcos, Texas (1990)
 Alley Theatre, Houston, Texas (1968)
 Dallas City Hall, Dallas, Texas (I.M. Pei, 1978)
 Lyndon Baines Johnson Presidential Library, Austin
 Lovett College, Rice University, Houston, Texas (1968)
 Perry–Castañeda Library (PCL), University of Texas at Austin, (1977)
 Webb Chapel Park Pavilion, Dallas

Utah
 Mountain Bell data processing center, Salt Lake City
 University of Utah College of Architecture and Planning

Vermont
 Cathedral Church of St. Paul (Burlington, Vermont)
 Charterhouse of the Transfiguration
 Elliott Pratt Center, Goddard College, Plainfield, Vermont

Virginia
 American Press Institute (demolished)
 FBI Academy, Quantico, Virginia (1972)
 The National Conference Center
 Sydney Lewis Hall, Washington and Lee University School of Law, Lexington, Virginia (1977)
 Unitarian Universalist Church of Arlington

Washington
 Alhadeff Sanctuary of Temple De Hirsch, Seattle
 Bellevue Arts Museum, Bellevue
 Freeway Park, Seattle, Washington (Lawrence Halprin, 1972–1976)
 Nuclear Reactor Building, University of Washington, The Architect Artist Group/TAAG, (1961)
 Odegaard Undergraduate Library, University of Washington, Seattle (Kirk, Wallace & McKinley, 1972)
 Rainier Tower, Seattle
 Seattle Central Library, Seattle
 Schmitz Hall, University of Washington, Seattle
 St. Joseph's Hospital, Tacoma
 Temple Beth Shalom, Spokane

Washington, D.C.

 Embassy of Canada (Arthur Erickson, 1989)
 Gelman Library, George Washington University
 Hirshhorn Museum and Sculpture Garden (Gordon Bunshaft, 1974)
 Hubert H. Humphrey Building, the United States Department of Health and Human Services headquarters (1977)
 J. Edgar Hoover Building (FBI national headquarters) (C.F. Murphy, 1974)
 James V. Forrestal Building
 L'Enfant Plaza – a plaza containing many US Government buildings
 Lauinger Library, Georgetown University (John Carl Warnecke, 1970)
 National Gallery of Art East Building

 National Museum of the American Indian (2004)

 Robert C. Weaver Federal Building
 Third Church of Christ, Scientist (Araldo Cossutta, 1971; demolished 2014)
 Washington Metro stations (1970–2001)
 Washington Hilton

West Virginia

Wisconsin
 Marcus Center for the Performing Arts, Milwaukee, Wisconsin (Harry Weese, 1966–69)
 Milwaukee County War Memorial, Milwaukee
 University of Wisconsin–Milwaukee, Madison
 Curtin Hall, (Maynard W. Mayer & Assoc., 1974)
 George L. Mosse Humanities Building
 Vilas Communication Hall
 Wingspread, Racine

Wyoming
 University of Wyoming dormitories and American Heritage Center

See also
List of Brutalist structures

Further reading

References

External links
 

Architecture lists
Brutalist architecture in the United States
Lists of buildings and structures in the United States